Bagley Township is a civil township of Otsego County in the U.S. state of Michigan.  The population was 5,886 at the 2010 census.

Communities
It was settled as a small resort community, and its name comes from both its shoreline on Otsego Lake and the abundant Arbutus in the nearby woods.
The community was settled by Oris Farrar and named after the numerous oak trees in the area.

Geography

Demographics
As of the census of 2000, there were 5,838 people, 2,189 households, and 1,613 families residing in the township. The racial makeup of the township was 97.48% White, 0.22% African American, 0.55% Native American, 0.34% Asian, 0.02% Pacific Islander, 0.12% from other races, and 1.27% from two or more races. Hispanic or Latino of any race were 0.77% of the population.

There were 2,189 households, out of which 37.9% had children under the age of 18 living with them, 59.4% were married couples living together, 10.1% had a female householder with no husband present, and 26.3% were non-families. 20.4% of all households were made up of individuals, and 6.6% had someone living alone who was 65 years of age or older.  The average household size was 2.66 and the average family size was 3.08.

In the township the population was spread out, with 28.8% under the age of 18, 7.0% from 18 to 24, 30.4% from 25 to 44, 23.1% from 45 to 64, and 10.6% who were 65 years of age or older.  The median age was 36 years. For every 100 females, there were 100.3 males.  For every 100 females age 18 and over, there were 98.1 males.

The median income for a household in the township was $44,205, and the median income for a family was $50,727. Males had a median income of $36,723 versus $21,388 for females. The per capita income for the township was $21,116.  About 5.8% of families and 6.1% of the population were below the poverty line, including 5.9% of those under age 18 and 9.6% of those age 65 or over.

References

Sources

Townships in Otsego County, Michigan
Townships in Michigan